Kristian Khenkel (born 7 November 1995) is a Belarusian professional ice hockey defenseman currently playing for Ak Bars Kazan in the Kontinental Hockey League (KHL).

Khenkel previously played in the KHL for HC Dinamo Minsk as well as in his native Belarusian Extraleague with Yunost Minsk.

Khenkel is also a member of the Belarusian national team and participated in the 2016, 2017 and 2018 IIHF World Championship.

References

External links

1995 births
Living people
Ak Bars Kazan players
Belarusian ice hockey defencemen
HC Dinamo Minsk players
Lethbridge Hurricanes players
Ice hockey people from Minsk
Yunost Minsk players